The 1982 Santa Clara Broncos football team represented Santa Clara University as a member of the Western Football Conference (WFC) during the 1982 NCAA Division II football season. The Broncos were led by head coach Pat Malley in his 24th year at the helm. They played home games at Buck Shaw Stadium in Santa Clara, California. The team finished the season with a record of seven wins and four losses (7–4, 3–1 WFC).

1982 was the first season for the Western Football Conference. In its initial season, the WFC had five teams. Three of them were the last members of the California Collegiate Athletic Association (CCAA) (Cal State Northridge, Cal Poly Pomona, and Cal Poly). They were joined by Santa Clara and Portland State. Santa Clara had played as an Independent prior to joining the WFC.

Schedule

Team players in the NFL
No Santa Clara Broncos players were selected in the 1983 NFL Draft.

The following finished their college career in 1982, were not drafted, but played in the NFL.

References

Santa Clara
Santa Clara Broncos football seasons
Santa Clara Broncos football